Mitterfeld may refer to the following places:

 a cadastral community of Kasten bei Böheimkirchen in Lower Austria, Austria
 a part of the municipality Riedering in the district of Rosenheim, Bavaria
 a place in Sankt Marein bei Knittelfeld, Styria, Austria